Lindsayfield is a residential area in the new town of East Kilbride, Scotland. The modern estate was constructed from the 1990s onwards.

Overview
Lindsayfield is situated next to the districts of Greenhills and Whitehills.  The main road around the outside of Lindsayfield extends offering a drive to the villages of Auldhouse, Strathaven, Chapelton and Leaburn. The main road through the area currently just ends at a dead end.  However, in the near future, the road will be continued through to Jackton, to allow for a large new part of the town to be built in the Jackton Community Growth Area. The new estate will, like Lindsayfield, use the Jackton Road as the boundary, but will also use the Hayhill Road.

Lindsayfield was constructed by a number of major house builders, including George Wimpey, Barratt, Lynch, Bellway, Stewart Milne, Cala, Dawn Homes and Persimmon Homes. Lindsayfield is accessed from the eponymous Road which divides four distinct estates on the northern side from the huge interconnecting southern residential scheme, extending from the Morrisons supermarket to the original western edge of the estate.

Like much of East Kilbride, Lindsayfield is characterised by landscaped open space dividing one phase of house-building from the next, and one builder's contribution from its rivals. There are a small number of bungalows, and a smattering of apartments throughout the district, but the vast majority of properties here are three, four and five-bedroom detached houses, making the district very popular with families. Since it is on the southern fringe of East Kilbride and is a closed suburb with no through-traffic, Lindsayfield has very little crime or antisocial behaviour and no graffiti. Local schools Castlefield Primary School, St. Vincent's Primary School and Crosshouse Primary School are where local children normally go to school, but there are plans to build a new school northwest of Lindsayfield in a new area.

Although much of Lindsayfield is aesthetically modern as it is 'new build', the telephony system currently in place is not modern. Most of Lindsayfield has telephony delivered by BT over a passive optical network (TPON). This means most of Lindsayfield can only previously get slow-speed Broadband, of around 1MB connection speed, however, FTTC has now been extended and currently reaches to Cabinet 73, with ongoing work providing additional capacity for the last remaining areas. A partial copper overlay programme was carried out in 2003 to allow some residents of Lindsayfield to receive a copper pair telephone line and thus an ADSL service.

See also
Noddy housing

References

External links

East Kilbride Community Growth Area by The Scottish Government

Areas of East Kilbride
Planned residential developments